Voufrades is a former municipality in Messenia, Peloponnese, Greece. Since the 2011 local government reform it is part of the municipality Messini, of which it is a municipal unit. The municipal unit has an area of 42.360 km2. Population 1,051 (2011). The seat of the municipality was in Chatzis.

References

Populated places in Messenia